The Free Workers' Union (German: Freie Arbeiterinnen- und Arbeiter-Union or Freie ArbeiterInnen-Union; abbreviated FAU) is an anarcho-syndicalist union in Germany and Switzerland.

History 

The FAU sees itself in the tradition of the Free Workers' Union of Germany (German: Freie Arbeiter Union Deutschlands; FAUD), the largest anarcho-syndicalist union in Germany until it disbanded in 1933 in order to avoid repression by the nascent National Socialist regime, and to illegally organize resistance against it. The FAU was then founded in 1977 and has grown consistently all through the 1990s. Now, the FAU consists of just under 40 groups, organized locally and by branch of trade. Because it rejects hierarchical organizations and political representation and believes in the concept of federalism, most of the decisions are made by the local unions. The federalist organization exists in order to coordinate strikes, campaigns and actions and for communication purposes. There are 800-1000 members organized in the various local unions.

The FAU publishes the bimonthly anarcho-syndicalist newspaper Direkte Aktion as well as pamphlets on current and historical topics.

Because it supports the classical concept of the abolition of the  wage system, the FAU was observed until 2011 by the Bundesamt für Verfassungsschutz (Federal Office for the Protection of the Constitution).

After having been disaffiliated from the International Workers' Association in 2016, the FAU was one of the founding members of the International Confederation of Labour (ICL) in 2018.

Strike Bikes
After Lone Star Funds announced it would close a bicycle factory in Nordhausen, Thuringia, it had acquired, its workers decided to occupy the factory in July 2007. From 22 to 26 October the workers continued bicycle production. With the help of the FAU, over 1,800 of these red bicycles were sold under the label "Strike Bike". The occupation of the factory ended after the company's liquidator forced the workers out.

Free Workers' Union Berlin
On 11 December 2009 the Berlin District Court issued an injunction on the Free Workers' Union Berlin (FAU-B) banning it from calling itself a union or grassroots union.The court decision was confirmed on 5 January 2010. The FAU views this as "the culmination of a series of attempts by the Neue Babylon Berlin GmbH to legally hogtie the strongest and most active form of workers' representation in the company. This attack on the basic right of freedom of association is a de facto ban of the union in Berlin". On 10 June 2010 the Kammergericht overturned the injunction.

Free Workers' Union in Switzerland 
In Switzerland, the FAU is represented by independent local syndicates in Bern, Lucerne, Solothurn and, since 2023, St.Gallen. Since 2010, the "Schwarzi Chatz" (Swiss-German, German: Schwarze Katze, English: Black Cat) has been published, which also serves as a mouthpiece for the FAU syndicates organized in Switzerland. Since 2022, there has been a separate youth organization, the "Freie Arbeiter*innen Jugend" (FAJ for short).

Translated with www.DeepL.com/Translator (free version)

Notes and references

Further reading
 Prinzipienerklärung (PDF) The declaration of principles of the FAU
 Statuten (PDF) Union federation statutes of the FAU

External links

 Official website
 FAU local federations
 FAU union sections
 FAU related mail order and publishing house
 FAU related pocket agenda 
 Official website of the newspaper Direkte Aktion

National trade union centers of Germany
International Workers' Association
Anarcho-syndicalism
Trade unions in Germany
1977 establishments in Germany
Anarchist organisations in Germany
Syndicalist trade unions

Trade unions established in 1977
Political organisations based in Germany